Headhunters of the Coral Sea is a 1940 book by Ion Idriess about Jack Ireland and Will d'Oyly, two survivors of the 1834 wreck, the Charles Eaton.

Idriess had previously written a version of this story in Drums of Mer.

References

1940 non-fiction books
1940 children's books
Books by Ion Idriess
Coral Sea Islands
Australian non-fiction books
Australian children's books
History books about Australia
Angus & Robertson books